Ambonostola is a genus of moths in the family Agonoxenidae with a single species, A. phosphoropis.

Species
Ambonostola phosphoropis Meyrick, 1935

References
Natural History Museum Lepidoptera genus database

Agonoxeninae
Monotypic moth genera